The discography of Groove Armada, a British electronic music duo, consists of eight studio albums, thirteen compilation albums, and twenty-four singles.

Albums

Studio albums

Compilation albums
 Back to Mine (2000), BPI: Silver
 The Remixes (2000)
 AnotherLateNight: Groove Armada (2002)
 The Dirty House Session (2002)
 The Best of Groove Armada (2004), UK #6 Gold (UK), BPI: Gold
 Doin' It After Dark Vol 1 (2004)
 Doin' It After Dark Vol 2 (2004)
 Essential Summer Groove (2004)
 Groove Armada Presents... (2004)
 Greatest Hits (2007), BPI: Silver
 GA10: 10 Year Story (2007)
 Groove Armada Presents Lovebox Festivals & Fiestas (2008)
 Twenty One (2019)
 GA25 (2022)

Extended plays
 Four Tune Cookie (1997)
 Lovebox EP (2002)
 Fireside Favourites (2003)
 EP (2009)
 Red Light Trax_EP.1 (2011)
 No Knock EP (2012)
 No Ejector Seat EP (2012)
 Pork Soda EP (2014)

Singles

References

External links
 

Groove Armada
Discographies of British artists